Statistics of DPR Korea Football League in the 1989 season.

Overview
Chandongja Sports Club won the championship.

References
RSSSF

DPR Korea Football League seasons
1
Korea
Korea